Vale do Mucuri is one of the twelve mesoregions of the Brazilian state of Minas Gerais. It is composed of 23 municipalities, distributed across 2 microregions.

References 

Mesoregions of Minas Gerais